DTO may refer to:

 Data transfer object
 Detailed Test Objective, an experiment to be performed by NASA in space
 Download to own
 Deodorized tincture of opium
 Diluted tincture of opium
 Disruptive Technology Office
 Disney's Toontown Online
 Driverless train operation
 Drug trafficking organizations
 Domestic terrorist organization
 Denton Municipal Airport (IATA and FAA airport codes)
 "D.T.O.": a song on Vision of Disorder (album), the self-titled debut by the American metalcore band
 Denkmäler der Tonkunst in Österreich (Monuments of Fine Austrian Music), a book series
 Direct Tools Outlet, a retailer of new & factory reconditioned tools